Sandwich bread (also referred to as sandwich loaf) is bread that is prepared specifically to be used for the preparation of sandwiches. Sandwich breads are produced in many varieties, such as white, whole wheat, sourdough, rye, multigrain and others. 

Sandwich bread is overwhelmingly commercially baked and pre-sliced, though any similar shaped loaf can be turned into sandwiches by hand.  It may be formulated to slice easily, cleanly or uniformly, and may have a fine crumb (texture) and light body. Sandwich bread may be designed to have a balanced proportion of crumb and crust, whereby the bread holds and supports fillings in place and reduces drips and messiness. Some may be designed to not become crumbly, hardened, dried or have too compressible a texture. 

Sandwich bread can refer to cross-sectionally square, sliced white and wheat bread, which has been described as "perfectly designed for holding square luncheon meat". The bread used for preparing finger sandwiches is sometimes referred to as sandwich bread. Pain de mie is a sandwich loaf.

History

In the 1930s in the United States, the term sandwich loaf referred to sliced bread. In contemporary times, U.S. consumers sometimes refer to white bread such as Wonder Bread as sandwich bread and sandwich loaf. Wonder Bread produced and marketed a bread called Wonder Round sandwich bread, which was designed to be used with round-shaped cold cuts and other fillings such as eggs and hamburgers, but it was discontinued due to low consumer demand. American sandwich breads have historically included some fat derived from the use of milk or oil to enrich the bread. Thin-sliced breads, wherein the bread is sliced somewhat thinner than customary, are often labeled as "sandwich bread".

Examples of U.S. bakers that produce sandwich bread are Wonder, Pepperidge Farm,  and Nature's Pride.  Some supermarket chains, such as Texas-based H-E-B, produce their own store brands of sandwich bread. Bonn Group of Industries of Ludhiana Punjab, India, produces a product called Super Sandwich Bread. Tai Pan Bread and Cakes Co. produces sandwich bread in Hong Kong. Mass-produced sandwich breads are sliced before being packaged.

See also

 Hoagie roll (also "bulkie" and related sandwich rolls)
 List of breads
 List of sandwiches
 Pullman loaf – sometimes referred to as sandwich loaf

References

Bibliography

Further reading

 
 
 
 

Breads
Sandwiches